Germinal is a 1913 black and white silent French language French film written and directed by Albert Capellani. It was released in the United States in 1914 as Germinal; or, The Toll of Labor. It is an adaptation of the 1885 novel Germinal by Emile Zola. With a running time of 140 minutes, it is one of the first films produced with a length of over two hours.

Synopsis
The year is 1863. Étienne Lantier gets work as a mineworker after having been fired from his job on the railroad for revolutionary behavior. Disheartened by the conditions in the mines, he returns to his revolutionary ideas and leads a strike of the mineworkers. Soldiers are brought in to quell the strike.

Cast
 Henry Krauss: Étienne Lantier
 Auguste Mévisto: Catherine Maheu
 Albert Bras: Hennebeau
 Paul Escoffier: Henri Negrel
 Jeanne Cheirel: La Maheude
 Cécile Guyon: Cécile Hennebeau
 Marc Gérard: Bonnemort
 René Lefèvre-Bel : Félix

External links
 

1913 films
1910s historical drama films
French historical drama films
1910s French-language films
Films directed by Albert Capellani
Films based on works by Émile Zola
Films set in 1863
Films about mining
French silent feature films
French black-and-white films
1913 drama films
Silent drama films
1910s French films